Sibleyville is an unincorporated community in Douglas County, Kansas, United States.  It is located five miles southeast of Lawrence.  It was at the intersection of County Road 458 and the Leavenworth, Lawrence and Fort Gibson railroad tracks although the town never had more than a dozen houses. Little remained of the town by the 1960s.

References

Further reading

External links
 Douglas County maps: Current, Historic, KDOT

Unincorporated communities in Kansas
Unincorporated communities in Douglas County, Kansas